Vincent Barteau (born 18 March 1962 in Caen) is a former French road racing cyclist. He is best known for wearing the yellow jersey in the 1984 Tour de France, retaining the lead for 12 days, and winning the stage on Bastille day in the 1989 Tour de France. He retired the following year. After retirement he bought a franchise from the Jeff de Bruges chocolate brand and operates three Jeff de Bruges shops in his native Normandy. In addition he directs the Tour de France's publicity caravan and has performed as a stand-up comedian and worked as a consultant for Eurosport.

Major results

1984
Circuit des genêts verts
Maël-Pestivien
Polynormand
Saint-Martin de Landelles
Tour de France:
Wearing yellow jersey for twelve days
1985
Ronde d'Aix-en-Provence
1989
Barentin
Lisieux
Tour de France:
Winner stage 13

References

External links 

Official Tour de France results for Vincent Barteau

French male cyclists
French Tour de France stage winners
1962 births
Living people
Sportspeople from Caen
Cyclists from Normandy